Zero is a 2016 Indian Tamil-language fantasy horror film written and directed by Shiv Mohaa. The film features Ashwin Kakumanu and Sshivada in the leading roles, while J. D. Chakravarthy, Ravi Raghavendra, Dr. Sharmila, Andreanne Nouyrigat and Tulasi play supporting roles. Filming began in June 2014 and lasted till March 2015, and the film had a theatrical worldwide release on 25 March 2016 to positive reviews.

Plot  
The movie starts off with the story of how God created Adam and Eve. Then, the screen moves to the present where they show newly wedded couple Balaji alias Bala (Ashwin Kakumanu) and Priya (Sshivada) moving into their new apartment. Bala's father Vijay Kumar (Ravi Raghavendra) does not approve of the marriage because of a history of mental illness in Priya's family. Her mother (Lintu Rony) had gone mad after she was pregnant with Priya and died giving birth to her. But Bala accepts Priya even after knowing her past, due to the great love he has on her. After moving into their new home, the young couple visits a store where Priya takes some lipsticks without paying and claims that she does not remember taking them. She argues with the security guard and is forced to leave. After returning home and refusing to meet Bala's visiting father, she shares her past with her neighbor and tells how she cannot get pregnant. Later that night, Priya dreams about her mother and talks to her about how everyone today called her a thief, and initially reluctant, she accepts that she stole the lipstick and explains that how she has an affinity towards the color pink and how she enjoys it.

After that, she soon enters a world where her mother is and starts sleepwalking at night. This is the part where weird and eerie things begin to happen around her, and she starts seeing illusions and becomes almost mad and stabs Bala one day. She gets stuck into the world   where her mom is and Lilith, a Biblical demon (Andreanne Nouyrigat) starts to roam freely after taking over the body of Priya. Bala searches for Solomon (J. D. Chakravarthy), an occult specialist who has the supernatural ability to speak with ghosts, and explains the situation to him. Solomon confronts the possessed Priya, and when Priya/Lilith touches Solomon, he sees everything about the being called Lilith who was created before Eve at the beginning of the time with Adam and how when Lilith rebelled and abandoned Adam did God create Eve as Adam's better half. God had cursed Lilith for abandoning Adam with the inability to have a child, and Lilith conceived so many times with the devil's child, but every child was dead or stillborn, and she finally becomes a hateful spirit who, over the time as a spirit, tortured and caused pregnant women to miscarriage, and kill themselves and trapping their soul in her spirit world, and Priya is the only child to escape her death, and now she wants to destroy the world as part of devils' bidding.

It is revealed that the Devil himself, in the form of a snake, has sent Lilith to carry his mission to destroy the world. Since Bala is a hindrance in her mission, she decides to kill him, but the Devil suggests that since Lilith resides in Priya's body and if Lilith touches Bala, her powers will be lost, as Priya and Bala have been soulmates for the past seven births and their love is more stronger than Lilith. Solomon explains the situation to other priests, and three exorcists from different parts of the world come together to challenge Lilith, but they eventually fail. When Lilith tries to choke Bala, he touches her, and Priya starts to remember all the times they spent together and gets unpossessed and returns to the real world where Balaji and Solomon are, and when Lilith is about to possess Priya again, God freezes the time and saves the world, and God blesses Priya with pregnancy. It is then revealed that the God chose the couple to be the parents of his child and also destroys Lilith permanently. The film ends with the Devil in the form of a snake, taking his usual form of a giant human and vowing to complete his mission by himself, hence hinting at a possible sequel, Zero-2.

Cast 
 Ashwin Kakumanu as Balaji alias Bala, the protagonist
 Sshivada as Priya / Lilith (present) 
 J. D. Chakravarthy as Solomon, an exorcist and occult specialist
 Ravi Raghavendra as Vijay Kumar, Balaji's father
 Lintu Rony as Priya's mother 
 Tulasi as Priya's neighbour
 Andreanne Nouyrigat as Lilith (past), the main antagonist as well as the satan 
 Anoop as The Evil Giant and Snake
 Dr. Sharmila as Sharmila, Balaji's paternal aunt
 Krishna Kumar as Koran
 Carl A. Harte as Head Exorcist

Production 
Shiv Mohaa, an associate of Bharat Bala, worked on the pre-production of the supernatural film for a year before approaching the producers and signing on JD Chakravarthy, Ashwin and Sshivada to play the lead roles. The team began production in June 2014, with scenes featuring Ashwin, Sshivada and JD Chakravarthy shot in Chennai. Further scenes will be shot in North India.

Soundtrack

The soundtrack was composed by Nivas K. Prasanna and it received positive reviews from critics. Behindwoods gave it a 3/5 saying that it is a "soulful" album which "one might take time to warm up to it". Indiaglitz also gave it a 3/5 saying it is "for the melody lovers".

Critical reception
Behindwoods gave it a 2.25/5 saying that it has "good research, strong music, but a complicated screenplay". The Hindu stated, "From a thrilling tale about a woman battling mental illness, the film, for all its signs of promise, reduces itself to another exorcism story." Deccan Chronicle gave it a 2.5/5 saying that it is "a thrilling ride into the unknown". The Times of India gave it a 3/5 saying that, "Zero is certainly that rare film where the audience is unsure where it will go next."

References

External links
 

2016 directorial debut films
2016 films
2010s science fiction horror films
2010s Tamil-language films
The Devil in film
Films scored by Nivas K. Prasanna
Indian science fiction horror films
Science fantasy films